Trio → Live is a live album by Pat Metheny, released in 2000, recorded with Bill Stewart and Larry Grenadier. It was recorded as a live complement to the trio’s studio album Trio 99→00, released the same year. The album covers a mixture of standards, older pieces by Metheny (such as the title track from his debut album Bright Size Life) and recent compositions. It was recorded live during 1999 and 2000 on tour in Europe, Japan and the United States, and was co-produced by Steve Rodby.

Track listing

Personnel
 Pat Metheny – acoustic and electric guitars, guitar synthesizer, 42-string Pikasso guitar, and 12-string fretless guitar
 Larry Grenadier – double bass
 Bill Stewart – drums

Pat Metheny live albums
2000 live albums
Warner Records live albums